"Come as You Were" is a song written by Paul Craft and first recorded by American country music artist Joe Stampley on his 1980 album After Hours. It was later recorded by American country pop music artist Jerry Lee Lewis in 1983 as a single from his album My Fingers Do the Talkin on MCA Records and it peaked at #66 on the country music charts.

In 1986, Barbara Mandrell cut the song for her Moments album, but it was not released as a single.

In 1988, T. Graham Brown covered the song for his album Come as You Were, releasing it as a single in December and taking it to #7 on the country music chart.

Chart performance

Year-end charts

References

1983 singles
1989 singles
Joe Stampley songs
Jerry Lee Lewis songs
Barbara Mandrell songs
T. Graham Brown songs
Songs written by Paul Craft
Song recordings produced by Ron Chancey
Capitol Records Nashville singles
Music videos directed by John Lloyd Miller
1980 songs